@Reverend_Makers is the third studio album by English band Reverend and the Makers, released on 18 June 2012. The album's lead single was "Bassline" and was released on 13 February 2012, via free download from the band's Facebook page. The band toured the UK following the album release, after a stint supporting Noel Gallagher's High Flying Birds in early Spring. The second single, 'The Wrestler', was released on 14 May. Upon release, the album went to #16 in the UK Chart, three places higher than the band's second album and the third single 'Out of the Shadows' was released in August.

Recording
In the summer of 2011, the band released a track via YouTube called "Riot" in a response to the riots across England. After recruiting new members such as ex-Milburn frontman Joe Carnall, McClure released news of a slot supporting Noel Gallagher in March 2012. The band released the lead single "Bassline" via Facebook in February of that year after playing their first gigs in two years just days before in Coventry.

Title
The album's title is @Reverend_Makers because McClure could not think of anything which summed up modern times better than the '@' symbol. The album name is the first music record to take its name from a micro-blogging site. McClure stated that the band originally wanted to call the album Out of the Shadows, but joked that it sounded too much like Alan Partridge's Bouncing Back. The band also debated calling the record Pure Bangers, but McClure decided it sounded like an Ibiza club mix.

Reception
@Reverend Makers was met with "mixed or average" reviews from critics. At Metacritic, which assigns a weighted average rating out of 100 to reviews from mainstream publications, this release received an average score of 55 based on 9 reviews.

Allmusic summarised the album as "a pure carefree party record [that] achieves its intentions far more convincingly than the band's previous party political broadcasts." NME called the album "a riot" and gave it 6/10. The Independent gave the record 4/5 commenting that McClure comes across as a "less messed up Shaun Ryder". MusicOMH, meanwhile, commented the record was only let down by its shortness in length.  Drowned in Sound gave the album 1/10, claiming that "many demons are slain at the altar of the Reverend in the course this album – wit, eloquence, incisiveness and originality to name but a few," while Q Magazine gave the album one star, advising readers to "steer clear" of the album.

Track listing

References

2012 albums
Cooking Vinyl albums
Reverend and The Makers albums
Articles with underscores in the title